Joseph Robidoux may refer to:

 Joseph Robidoux I (1701–1778), fur trader
 Joseph Robidoux II (1722–1778), fur trader
 Joseph Robidoux III (1750–1809), fur trader and merchant
 Joseph Robidoux IV (1783–1868), founder of St. Joseph, Missouri